DFA may refer to:

Business
 Dairy Farmers of America, in agriculture
 Design For All, produced for the Target Corporation

Education
 Doctor of Fine Arts, an academic degree
 John S. Davidson Fine Arts Magnet School ("Davidson Fine Arts"), in Augusta, Georgia, U.S.

Engineering
 Design for All, as a design philosophy
 Design for assembly, manufacturing improvement to allow faster or automated assembly or assembly with fewer parts

Entertainment

Gaming
 “Dart Farm Ace”,  a strategy in the online PvP game Bloons TD Battles
 Diverse Filmmakers Alliance (DFA)
 Death From Above, a jump-jet attack tactic in the BattleTech game universe
 Double Fine Adventure, working title of the point-and-click adventure game Broken Age

Music
 Death from Above 1979, a Toronto-based Canadian alternative rock duo
 DFA (Italian rock band), an Italian progressive rock band from Verona, Italy
 DFA Records, an independent record label and production team

Sports
 Darwin Football Association, an Australian rules football league in Tasmania
 Designated for assignment, a type of player transaction in Major League Baseball
 Dominica Football Association, the governing body of football in Dominica

Finance
 Dimensional Fund Advisors, in finance
 Dodd–Frank Wall Street Reform and Consumer Protection Act, a US federal law signed in 2010
 Dynamic financial analysis, in finance

Government and politics
 Democracy for America, a progressive political action committee in the United States
 Department of Foreign Affairs, an executive office of a sovereign state that helps form its foreign policy
 Partnership for a Drug-Free America, a nonprofit organization

Mathematics, science, and technology

Computing
 Data-flow analysis, a technique for gathering information about the possible set of values calculated at various points in a computer program
 Deterministic finite automaton, a finite state machine accepting finite strings of symbols
 Differential fault analysis, in cryptography, a type of side channel attack
 Dual factor authentication

Science
 Descent from antiquity, the process of establishing a generation-by-generation descent of living persons
 Direct fluorescent antibody, a medical test
 Humid continental climate with hot summer (designated Dfa), in climate classification

Statistics
 Detrended fluctuation analysis, a variation of the Hurst Exponent technique, used in the analysis of fractal time series
 Discriminant function analysis, a classification procedure